Cade F. York (born January 27, 2001) is an American football placekicker for the Cleveland Browns of the National Football League (NFL). He played college football at LSU.

High school career 
York attended Prosper High School in Texas, where he played both soccer and football, and was one of the top kicking prospects in the nation in the latter sport. He committed to playing college football at LSU, and had set an Under Armour All-America Game record for longest field goal, hitting a 59-yard field goal, besting his career long in high school of 47 yards.

College career

Freshman season 
York was named the Tigers starting kicker before the start of the 2019 season. He got off to a shaky start in the season, missing an extra point against Northwestern State and field goals against Utah State and Florida, but rebounded to make the SEC All-Freshman team, as well as second-team All-SEC as the Tigers won the 2020 College Football Playoff.

Sophomore season 
York finished his sophomore season perfect on extra points (36-for-36), hit 85.7% of his field goal attempts (18-for-21), and was a semi-finalist for the Lou Groza Award, given to the top placekicker in college football.

In the December 12 game against Florida, York hit his career-long field goal of 57 yards with 27 seconds remaining in the fourth quarter to put LSU ahead 37–34, leading to the Tigers' upset of the then-No. 6 ranked team in the country.

York was named a first-team All-SEC by the coaches and second-team All-SEC by the Associated Press (AP) at the end of the season. He was also named a second-team All-American by the AP and the Football Writers Association of America.

Career statistics

Professional career

York was drafted by the Cleveland Browns with the 124th overall pick in the fourth round of the 2022 NFL Draft.

He began his career going 4/4 for field goals and 2/2 for PAT against the Carolina Panthers, including a game-winning 58 yard field goal in the 26–24 win. York's performance in his first professional game also led to AFC Special Teams Player of the Week honors.

References

External links 
 
 Cleveland Browns bio
 LSU Tigers bio

2001 births
Living people
People from McKinney, Texas
Players of American football from Texas
Sportspeople from the Dallas–Fort Worth metroplex
American football placekickers
LSU Tigers football players
Cleveland Browns players